Rex Allen Caldwell (born May 5, 1950) is an American professional golfer who played on the PGA Tour, Nationwide Tour and Champions Tour.

Caldwell was born in Everett, Washington. He attended San Fernando Valley State College. He turned professional in 1972.

Caldwell played on the PGA Tour from 1972 to 1990. His best year in professional golf was 1983 when he teamed with John Cook to win at the World Cup. He also had six top-10 finishes that year in PGA Tour events which included a win at the LaJet Coors Classic and four solo 2nd or T-2 finishes. His best finish in a major was third place at the 1979 PGA Championship. He has more than $1.3 million in career earnings.

Caldwell also played on what is now the Nationwide Tour in the 1990s. His best finish was a T-2 at the 1994 NIKE Dakota Dunes Open.

After turning 50, Caldwell played on the Champions Tour from 2000 to 2006. His best finish was a T-6 at the 2003 Turtle Bay Championship.

Caldwell has played on several other tours during his regular and senior careers including the Mexican Tour, Texas Tour, Sunbelt Senior Tour and the Heartland Players Senior Tour. He lives in San Antonio, Texas with his wife, JoAnn.

Professional wins (4)

PGA Tour wins (1)

PGA Tour playoff record (0–2)

Other wins (2)
1978 California State Open
1983 World Cup (with John Cook)

Senior wins (1)
Hollywood Casino Senior Classic (Heartland Players Senior Tour)

Results in major championships

DQ = disqualified
CUT = missed the half-way cut (3rd round cut in 1982 Open Championship)
"T" indicates a tie for a place

Summary

Most consecutive cuts made – 3 (twice)
Longest streak of top-10s – 1

U.S. national team appearances
Professional
World Cup: 1983 (winners)

See also 

 1974 PGA Tour Qualifying School graduates
1988 PGA Tour Qualifying School graduates

References

External links

American male golfers
PGA Tour golfers
PGA Tour Champions golfers
Golfers from Washington (state)
Golfers from San Antonio
Sportspeople from Everett, Washington
1950 births
Living people